A portfolio in the European Commission is an area of responsibility assigned to a European Commissioner, usually connected to one or several Directorates-General (DGs).

Portfolios

Agriculture

The Commissioner for Agriculture and Rural Development is in charge of rural issues including most notably the controversial Common Agricultural Policy (CAP) which represents 44% of the EU budget. The post used to be combined with Fisheries in the Jenkins and Thorn Commissions. The related DG is the Directorate-General for Agriculture and Rural Development

Climate Action

The post of Commissioner for Climate Action was created in February 2010, being split from the environmental portfolio to focus on fighting climate change. The first Commissioner to take the post was Connie Hedegaard who headed the Directorate-General for Climate Action.

Competition

The Commissioner for Competition is the member responsible for commercial competition, company mergers, cartels, state aid, and anti-trust law. The position became the sole merger authority for the European Economic Area in September 1990. The Competition Commissioner is one of the most powerful positions in the commission and is notable in affecting global companies. For example, the commissioner has been pursued a number of high-profile cases against anticompetitive behaviour; such as the case against the merger of Sony – BMG, against Apple Inc. regarding iTunes, the ongoing case against Microsoft and in particular the GE-Honeywell merger attempt in 2001. In 2007, Neelie Kroes (then Competition Commissioner) was the only Commissioner to make Forbes Magazine's List of The World's 100 Most Powerful Women; she held position 59.

Development
The Commissioner for Development deals with promoting sustainable development in deprived regions (such as ACP countries and the EU's OCTs). It used to include humanitarian aid. The related DG is Directorate-General for International Partnerships

Digitalization and Informations

The Commissioner for the Digital Agenda, previously the Commissioner for Information Society and Media, is responsible media and information issues such as telecoms and ICT.

2004–2010 Commissioner, Viviane Reding, found a relatively popular policy in seeking to lower roaming charges of mobile phones when travelling within the EU, stating: "For years, mobile roaming charges have remained unjustifiably high. We are therefore tackling one of the last borders within Europe's internal market". Her legislation to cap roaming charges was approved by the Parliament in April 2007 On 7 April 2006 the commission launched the new ".eu" TLD for websites for EU companies and citizens wishing to have a non-national European internet address. This has proved popular with 2.5 being registered by April 2007. It is now the seventh most popular TLD worldwide, and third in Europe (after .de and .uk)

In the previous Commission information society was linked with Enterprise (now linked with Industry).

Economic and Financial Affairs, Taxation and Customs

The Commissioner for Economic and Financial Affairs is responsible for the EU's economic affairs including the euro. In the Juncker Commission, the post also acquired responsibility for taxation and anti-fraud protection.

There have been calls for a strengthened economic portfolio with Ségolène Royal suggesting that there should be an economic government for the eurozone and at the start of the first Barroso Commission Germany suggested an economic "super-commissioner" – which could see a change in this position. That idea, however, was dropped but the Enterprise and Industry Commissioner was strengthened in response.

Education, Culture, Sport and Youth

The Commissioner for Education, Culture, Multilingualism and Youth is responsible for policies in education and training, youth, sport, civil society, culture, translation, interpretation and relations with the Office for Official Publications of the European Communities.

The post was enlarged since the Prodi Commission with the addition of training and multilingualism (The Directorate-General is still just Directorate-General for Education and Culture). When Romania joined the EU in 2007, multilingualism was handed over to the new Romanian commissioner. In its place the portfolio included youth, sport and civil society. Multilingualism was reintroduced in 2010 under Barroso's second Commission.

The commission has become increasingly active in education. The ERASMUS programme, which was established in 1987, is a student exchange programme promoting mobility of students between European universities. The Bologna process aims to create a European Higher Education Area where academic qualifications can be recognised across Europe. The European Institute of Technology is a proposed research university.

The previous portfolio to the current was Culture, merged with Audiovisual policy and EP relations.

Employment and Social Affairs

The Commissioner for Employment, Social Affairs and Inclusion is responsible for matters including those relating to employment, discrimination and social affairs such as welfare. The post has had various alterations; under the first Barroso Commission it was known as Employment, Social Affairs and Equal Opportunities.

Energy

The Commissioner holds responsibility for the European Union's energy policy as well as nuclear issues (Euratom). The Directorate-General for this portfolio is shared with the Commissioner for Transport as the Directorate-General for Mobility and Transport.

The EU is an active supporter of the Kyoto Protocol, which it signed alongside its member-states. In March 2007 the Union committed itself to cut  emissions by 20 percent by 2020.EU agrees on carbon dioxide cuts There is also a desire to reduce dependency on Russian energy supplies following the disputes between Russia and Belarus and Ukraine. In April 2007 five southern European countries signed a deal to build an oil pipeline from the Black Sea to Italy which will help diversify energy sources.

Enlargement, European Neighbourhood Policy and External Relations

The Commissioner for Enlargement and the European Neighbourhood Policy is concerned with foreign policy towards the EU's nearest neighbours. The enlargement portfolio began to be created out of the regionalised foreign policy posts. In particular the Santer Commission post for relations with central and eastern Europe as those countries began applying to join. The Neighbourhood Policy element was created in 2004 as part of the External Relations portfolio. When that portfolio was absorbed by the High Representative in 2009, Neighbourhood Policy was transferred to Trade and then to Enlargement in 2010 under the Second Barroso Commission.

Environment

The Commissioner for the Environment is responsible for protection of the European Union's environment. Specific actions relating to climate change are under the responsibility of the Climate Action commissioner as of 2010.

The EU has made a number of environmental moves, partially in regards to climate change. Most notably it signed the Kyoto Protocol in 1998, set up its Emission Trading Scheme in 2005 and is agreeing to unilaterally cut its emissions by 20% by 2020. (See: Energy policy of the European Union). Other policies include; the Natura 2000 a widespread and successful network of nature conservation sites, the Registration, Evaluation and Authorisation of Chemicals (REACH) directive requiring safety testing on widely used chemicals and the Water Framework Directive ensuring water quality reaches higher standards.

For more, see European Climate Change Programme, European Union Emission Trading Scheme, Renewable energy in the European Union and the Directorate-General for the Environment.

Budget and Human Resources

The Commissioner for Budget and Human Resources is primarily responsible for the management of the budget of the European Union and related financial issues except for budgetary discharge which falls under the Commissioner for administration commissioner. Previously simply for the budget, the position expanded under the Prodi Commission to include financial programming. The related DG is the Directorate-General for Budget.

Under Commissioner Grybauskaitė, Commissioner's 121.6 billion euro 2008 budget proposed that for the first time funding for sustainable growth (€57.2 billion) would be higher than that of the Common Agricultural Policy (€56.3 billion), traditionally the largest source of expenditure in the EU. There would be an increase in cohesion funds, energy and transport of 14%, research by 11% and lifelong learning by 9%. There would also be an increase in the administrative budget, aid to Kosovo and Palestinian institutions and funds towards the Galileo project. Group of EU states wary of 2008 budget plan

Financial Stability, Financial Services and Capital Markets Union

The Commissioner for Financial Stability, Financial Services and Capital Markets Union is responsible for banking and finance. It was a role created under the Juncker Commission.

Institutional Reform, Democracy and Demography

Health and Consumer Protection

The Commissioner for Health and Consumer Policy is responsible for matters of public health, food safety, animal health, welfare and consumer affairs. Between 2007 and 2010 it was split into a Commissioner for Health and a Commissioner for Consumer Protection – in order to give a portfolio for the incoming Bulgarian Commissioner. It was recombined under the second Barroso Commission.

High Representative

The High Representative became a Commissioner on 1 December 2009, replacing the External Relations Commissioner (see historical below). Although other external relations posts continue to exist, such as trade, the High Representative is the most senior foreign affairs post in the EU.

Home Affairs
The Commissioner for Home Affairs was created in 2010 by dividing the previous Justice, Freedom and Security portfolio into a security orientated post (DG HOME) and a post centred on justice, on individual and fundamental rights (DG JUST). Its DG is the Directorate-General for Migration and Home Affairs (DG HOME).

Industry and Entrepreneurship

The Commissioner for Enterprise and Industry post was enlarged from the Commissioner for Enterprise and Information Society portfolio in the Prodi Commission to include Industry. At the start of the first Barroso Commission, Germany, backed by Britain and France suggested an economic "super-commissioner" to fight for competitiveness. Although rejected, this idea though has been taken on by Verheugen, as the Enterprise and Industry portfolio was enlarged and was made a Vice President.

As Commissioner, he indicates his aim to increase the competitiveness of Europe, there is a separate Commissioner for Competition dealing with competition between companies within Europe. However, with the numerous economic portfolios, there is a degree of overlap which has been a matter of concern for him along with the purported difficulty of firing director-generals. This Commissioner also chairs the Competitiveness Council Commissioners Group and is the vice chair of the Group of Commissioners on the Lisbon Strategy. He is expected to be the European chair of the new Transatlantic Economic Council. The relevant DG is Directorate-General for Enterprise and Industry.

Internal Market

The Commissioner for Internal Market and Services concerned the development of the 480-million-strong European single market, promoting free movement of people, goods, services and capital. The related DG is Directorate-General for Internal Market and Services and it is also related to the Office for Harmonization in the Internal Market.

Commissioner Frits Bolkestein (Netherlands) served in the Prodi Commission between 1999 and 2004. In addition to holding the Internal Market portfolio he also held Taxation and Customs Union. Bolkestein is most notable for the Directive on services in the internal market, which is commonly called the "Bolkestein Directive". The directive aimed at enabling a company from a one member-state to recruit workers in another member-state under the law of the company's home state. It was to help the development of the internal market for services, the development of which has lagged behind that for goods. However, there was a great deal of concern about its effect on social standards and welfare, triggering competition between various parts of Europe. This led to significant protests across Europe against the directive including a notable protest at the European Parliament in Strasbourg by port workers which led to damage to the building. MEPs eventually reached a compromise on the text and the Parliament adopted it on 12 December 2006; 2 years after Bolkestein left office, under the Barroso Commission.

The portfolio was merged in 2014 with the one for Industry and Entrepreneurship.

International Cooperation, Humanitarian Aid, Civil Protection and Crisis Management 

The Commissioner for International Cooperation, Humanitarian Aid and Crisis Response was created under the second Barroso Commission in 2010 . It deals in party with dealing with humanitarian disasters and humanitarian aid: the EU is the largest supplier of aid in the world.

Interinstitutional Relations and Foresight
The Vice President of the European Commission for Interinstitutional Relations and Foresight is responsible for the administration of the commission, including management of some of the commission's Internal Services; in particular consolidation of administrative reform, personnel and administration, European Schools and security. The Commissioner is also responsible for the following departments; the Directorate-General for Personnel and Administration, the Office for the Administration and Payment of Individual Entitlement, the Directorate-General for Informatics, the Office of Infrastructure and Logistics, and relations with the European Personnel Selection Office. The current Vice President is Maroš Šefčovič.

Prior to 2010 it was also responsible for Audit and Anti-Fraud, now merged with taxation, but gain responsibility for relations with the other EU institutions.

Justice and Gender Equality

The Commissioner for Justice, Fundamental Rights and Citizenship was created in 2010 by dividing the previous Justice, Freedom and Security portfolio into a security orientated post and a justice and fundamental rights orientated post. The portfolio was then renamed into Justice, Consumers and Gender Equality under the Juncker Commission.

Maritime Affairs and Fisheries

The Maritime affairs and Fisheries Commissioner is responsible for policies such as the Common Fisheries Policy, which is largely a competence of the EU rather than the members. The Union has 66,000 km of coastline and the largest Exclusive Economic Zone in the world, covering 25 million km2.

On 7 June 2006 the Commission published a green paper for a Maritime Policy and consultation will end in June 2007. The document addresses a number of issues such as sustainable development, protection of the environment, skills and employment, technology and resources, coastal safety and tourism, financial support and heritage. The Commission came under fire in May 2007 for not penalise French fishermen after over-fishing the threatened bluefin tuna by 65% while backing penalties on Irish fishermen for over-fishing mackerel.

Regional Policy and Cohesion

The Regional Policy Commissioner, occasional Regional Affairs Commissioner, is responsible for managing the regional policy of the EU which takes up a third of the EU's budget; it includes the European Regional Development Fund, Structural Funds and Cohesion Funds, Instrument for Structural Policies for Pre-Accession and the European Social Fund. The related DG is Directorate-General for Regional Policy.

Research, Innovation and Science

The name has had several variations: under the first Barroso Commission it was Science and Research, under Prodi it was simply "Research", Santer was "Research, Science and Technology" and under Delors it was combined with others as "Industry, information technology and science and research" and other various names and combinations prior. The related DG is the Directorate-General for Research.

The 2004–2010 Commissioner, Potočnik, aimed to create a European Research Area.

Security Union
The Commissioner for Security Union was created in 2016.

Statistics, Audit and Anti-Fraud

The Commissioner for Taxation, Customs, Statistics, Audit and Anti-Fraud is responsible for the EU's customs union and taxation policy. The European Union has had a customs union since the creation of the European Economic Community and that union extends to the non-EU members of the European Economic Area and to Turkey, Andorra and San Marino. Since 2010 it gained responsibility for audit (budgetary discharge, internal audit, counter fraud): in particular the Internal Audit Service and the European Anti-fraud Office.

Trade

The Commissioner for Trade is responsible for the EU's external trade policy. Due to the size of the European economy, being the world's largest market and having a huge slice of world trade, this position can be very important in dealing with other world economic powers such as China or the United States. Former Commissioner Leon Brittan commented that "Frankly, it is more important than most [national] cabinet jobs". The Commissioner leads Europe in organisations such as the World Trade Organization (WTO). Concluding WTO talks after the collapse of the Doha Development Round has been a contentious point, with the EU not willing to cut agricultural subsidies without similar action by the United States. The related DG is Directorate-General for Trade.

Transport

The portfolio is responsible for the development of transport infrastructure in the EU such as road and rail networks but also navigation systems such as the Galileo positioning system.

Historical portfolios
Many portfolios have been combined and split under different president's, below is a few of the previous posts that have since been abolished.

Administrative Affairs, Audit and Anti-Fraud
The Commissioner for Administrative Affairs, Audit and Anti-Fraud was in the first Barroso Commission and was responsible for the commission's internal administration and anti-fraud efforts.

Its administrative duties included management of some of the commission's Internal Services; in particular consolidation of administrative reform, personnel and administration, European Schools and security. The Commissioner is also responsible for the following departments; the Directorate-General for Personnel and Administration, the Office for the Administration and Payment of Individual Entitlement, the Directorate-General for Informatics, the Office of Infrastructure and Logistics, and relations with the European Personnel Selection Office. Its other responsibilities were for audit (budgetary discharge, internal audit, counter fraud): in particular the Internal Audit Service and the European Anti-fraud Office.

Administrative Reform
A position created for the Prodi Commission in the wake of the Santer Commission corruption scandal.

Agriculture and Fisheries
This position used deal with the Common Agricultural Policy (CAP) and the Common Fisheries Policy (CFP). It existed when the CFP was created in the Jenkins until the Thorn Commission when it was split into Agriculture and Rural Affairs and Fisheries and Maritime Affairs.

Communication strategy
The Communication strategy portfolio in the first Barroso Commission existed between 2004 and 2010 combined with Institutional Relations. Under the second Barroso Commission this was dropped as it had no powers and was open to allegations of propaganda.

Consumer Protection
The Commissioner for Consumer Protection was responsible for protecting the rights of consumers vs corporations between 2007 and 2010. The only Commissioner was Meglena Kuneva (ALDE).

This specific portfolio was created in 2007, separated from the Health portfolio. However, it first appeared in the Jenkins Commission as "Consumer Affairs" though the Barroso Commission was the first time it has been an independent portfolio. The independent portfolio was created when Bulgaria and Romania joined the European Union on 1 January 2007. It used to be part of the Health and Consumer Protection portfolio which was held by Markos Kyprianou. Unlike the Multilingualism portfolio that was created for Leonard Orban, this post was welcomed due to the large size of the combined portfolio. The Directorate-General is still merged with that office. In 2010 it was recombined with Health in the second Barroso Commission.

External Relations

The Commissioner for External Relations, known as the Commissioner for External Relations and the European Neighbourhood Policy at its demise dealt with general foreign relations and representation of the Commission abroad. It occasionally took on related responsibilities such as enlargement or neighbourhood policy, though most of the time other separate external relations portfolios existed such as development or trade. Early on external relations were split according to geography between various Commissioners. On 1 December 2009 its responsibilities were merged into the High Representative.

Energy, Euratom Supply Agency, SMEs and Tourism
An expanded version of the Energy portfolio in the Santer Commission, including parts of Industry (SMEs) and Tourism which has only appeared under Santer.

Health
The Commissioner for Health existed between 2007 and 2010 when it was split off from Consumer Protection for the new Bulgarian Commissioner. It was recombined under the succeeding Commission in 2010.

Justice, Freedom and Security
The Justice, Freedom and Security portfolio was roughly on the former third pillar: Police and Judicial Co-operation in Criminal Matters. The position covers such matters as judicial matters, human rights, equality laws, immigration control, policing and citizenship (see Area of freedom, security and justice). The relevant DG was Directorate-General for Justice, Freedom and Security.

As a concession to the liberals, Barroso split the post in 2010 into the Commissioner for Home Affairs (the security aspect) and the Commissioner for Justice, Fundamental Rights and Citizenship (the human rights aspect).

Previous commissioners:

Multilingualism
The Commissioner for Multilingualism was responsible for language policy of the European Union, i.e., promoting multilingualism for the citizens and the institutions of the EU. It was created on 1 January 2007 during the Barroso Commission. The only commissioner is Leonard Orban (2007–2010). The post was created on 1 January 2007, in the enlarged Barroso Commission after the accession of Bulgaria and Romania to the EU. Multilingualism had been a responsibility of the European Commissioner for Education, Training, Culture and Multilingualism (held by Ján Figeľ between 2004 and 2007). Under the second Barroso Commission, the post was re-merged into the education and culture portfolio (held by Androulla Vassiliou).

The new portfolio was criticised for vagueness and ambiguity, it has been claimed that the post overlaps with responsibilities of other Commissioners. The Conference of Presidents of the European Parliament has asked the current president of the Commission José Manuel Barroso to clarify the mandate of Commissioner for Multilingualism and of other members of the commission with regards to the "intercultural dialogue".

European Parliament Socialist Group (PES) leader Martin Schulz suggested a portfolio for the protection of ethnic minorities instead. His party suggested the introduction of the protection of the Roma minority. Barroso turned down the PES proposal and defended the post. He stated that Commissioner for Education, Training and Culture Ján Figeľ "will remain responsible for the management of actions to directly promote the inter-cultural dialogue".

Politically, the portfolio was mainly focused on promoting foreign languages learning as means for worker's mobility and business competitiveness rather than emphasizing language rights of speakers of regional, minority, lesser-used and migrant languages. Commissioner for Multilingualism is also responsible, alongside the President of the Commission, Barroso, and the European Commissioner for Education, Training and Culture, Ján Figeľ to work on "intercultural dialogue", including the 2008 European Year of Intercultural Dialogue.

Administratively, Commissioner for Multilingualism was in charge of the Directorate-General for Translation, the DG for Interpretation and the Office for Official Publications of the European Communities, as well as for the Multilingualism policy unit (EAC-C-5) in the DG for Education and Culture, with 3,400 staff in total – about 15 per cent of the Brussels executive's workforce- and with about 1 percent of the EU budget.

References

European Commission